The men's singles competition of the figure skating at the 2015 Winter Universiade was held at the Universiade Igloo in Granada. The short program was held on February 4 and the free skating was held on February 5.

Results

Short program

Free skating

Overall

References

External links
 ISU Results Page

Men